The Captivating Star of Happiness is a 1975 Soviet historical drama. The title is an allusion to a line from a poem by Alexander Pushkin.  It is a costume drama dedicated "to the women of Russia".

Plot
The story is set in the aftermath of the Decembrist revolt against Tsar Nicholas I in 1825. The revolt is repressed, and the military officers involved confess one by one. They are sentenced to exile in Siberia and their wives face the decision as to whether or not to follow them.

Cast
Irina Kupchenko as Princess Ekaterina Ivanovna Trubetskaya
Aleksey Batalov as Prince Sergei Trubetskoy
Natalya Bondarchuk as Princess Mariya Volkonskaya
Oleg Strizhenov as Prince Sergey Volkonsky
Eva Shikulskaya as Polina Göbl-Annenkova, in marriage Praskovya Yegorovna
Igor Kostolevsky as Ivan Aleksandrovich Annenkov, Decembrist, cavalergard
Lev Ivanov as Nikolay Raevsky, a general from the cavalry (not in the credits)
Raisa Kurkina as Sofya Alekseevna Raevskaya, the wife of NN Raevsky
Tatyana Pankova as Anna Annenkova, the mother of IA Annenkov
Aleksandr Porokhovshchikov as Pavel Pestel
Victor Kostetskiy as Pyotr Kakhovsky
Yuri Rodionov as Sergey Muravyov-Apostol
Oleg Yankovsky as Kondraty Ryleyev
Tatyana Fedorova as Natalia Ryleeva, the wife of KF Ryleev
Vasily Livanov as Emperor Nicholas I
Innokenty Smoktunovsky as Ivan Bogdanovich Zeidler, Irkutsk Governor
Vladislav Strzhelchik as Count Laval
Dmitry Shilko as Count Mikhail Miloradovich, St. Petersburg Governor-General
Igor Dmitriev as Count Lebzeltern, Austrian Envoy in St. Petersburg
Boris Dubensky as Emperor Alexander I
Victor Terekhov as Vasily Vasilyevich Levashov, Adjutant-General
Vadim Makarovsky as Vosh
Arkady Trusov as Fedor, valet Annenkov
Mikhail Kokshenov as Nikita, servant of Annenkov-senior
Aleksei Kozhevnikov as Paphnutius, servant of Zeidler

Production
After making the 1970 hit film White Sun of the Desert, Motyl received no directorial projects for five years.

When Motyl got the green light from Goskino to make a film about the Decembrists, he still had problems and had to do many rewrites because the authorities believed that the picture had too many parallels to the Soviet regime and allusions about Soviet dissidents.

Nevertheless, the screenplay was rejected. Then Motyl went to Leningrad, to the regional party committee. He handed the script to the secretary on ideology; the woman did not have time to read it and instead gave the text to her daughter who ended up adoring it. The mother called Filipp Ermash, Moscow's Minister of Cinematography and declared that "The Leningrad Regional Committee is interested in the film about the Decembrists!" Thus the script got to Lenfilm, but the budget was cut to 1.5 million rubles from the initial 3.5 million.

The locations of the film included the Peterhof Palace and the Winter Palace.

References

External links

Films set in 1825
Films set in the Russian Empire
Films about rebels
Lenfilm films
1975 films
1970s historical drama films
Russian historical drama films
1970s Russian-language films
Soviet historical drama films
1975 drama films
Cultural depictions of Nicholas I of Russia